Majestad de la Sierra is a Duranguense band that was formed in Mexico by former band member from K-Paz de la Sierra Beto Durán and Luis Diaz.

Split
Eight months after Sergio Gomez death, his best friend Beto Durán and Luis Díaz made their Group Majestad De la Sierra on August 7, 2008. Before the group was formed, Durán and Diaz were secretly recording an album with 5 other people from K-Paz without anyone knowing except Miguel Galindo.

Their first album was released on March 10, 2009, called Nueva Ilussion. They already released their first song called "Eres Mi Obsecion"

Discography

Albums
2009: Nueva Ilussion

See also
K-Paz de la Sierra
AK-7

References

Duranguense music groups
Mexican musical groups